Société Nationale d'Électricité (SNEL) is the national electricity company of the Democratic Republic of the Congo.  Its head office building is located in the district of La Gombe in the capital city, Kinshasa.  SNEL operates the Inga Dam facility on the Congo River, and it also operates Thermal power stations.

External links

Official website (in French). Archived from the original on 11 December 2018].

Electric power companies of the Democratic Republic of the Congo
Companies based in Kinshasa